The Queendom of Sol is a science fiction book series by Wil McCarthy.  It includes:

 The Collapsium (2000) —  Sturgeon Award finalist as a short story and nominated for 2002 Nebula Award for Best Novel.
 The Wellstone (2003)
 Lost in Transmission (2004)
 To Crush the Moon (2005) — Nominated for 2007 Nebula Award for Best Novel
The first two novels of the series was also printed together as The Monarchs of Sol by Science Fiction Book Club.

The Queendom referred to is actually the present-day Kingdom of Tonga.  In the Queendom of Sol, humanity has returned to monarchism as a stabilizing force in the face of accelerating technological change.

References

Science fiction book series